Waihiga may refer to:

 David Waihiga (born 1967), Kenyan politician
 Waihiga Mwaura, Kenya journalist